The men's 77 kilograms event at the 2002 Asian Games took place on October 4, 2002 at Pukyong National University Gymnasium.

Schedule
All times are Korea Standard Time (UTC+09:00)

Records

Results 
Legend
NM — No mark

New records
The following records were established during the competition.

References
2002 Asian Games Official Report, Page 753
 Weightlifting Database
 Men's results

Weightlifting at the 2002 Asian Games